The 2020 Division 1, part of the 2020 Swedish football season is the 15th season of Sweden's fourth-tier football league in its current format.

Teams
84 teams contest the league divided into six sections - Norra Götaland, Norra Svealand, Norrland, Södra Svealand, Västra Götaland and Östra Götaland. The Division comprises 60 teams returning from the 2019 season, six relegated from Division 1 and 18 promoted from Division 3. The champion of each section will qualify directly for promotion to Division 1, the runner-up from each section enters a six-team, two-group playoff, with the winner of each group earning promotion to Division 1. The bottom two teams in each section are relegated to Division 3 with the 12th place team in each section entering a relegation playoff.

League tables

Norra Götaland

Norra Svealand

Norrland

Södra Svealand

Västra Götaland

Östra Götaland

Promotion play-offs

Relegation play-offs

References

Swedish Football Division 2 seasons
4
Sweden
Sweden